Zinapécuaro is a municipality in the Mexican state of Michoacán, located  northeast of the state capital Morelia.

Geography
The municipality of Zinapécuaro is located in northeast Michoacán on the border with Guanajuato. In Michoacán it borders the municipalities of Álvaro Obregón to the west, Indaparapeo and Queréndaro to the southwest, Hidalgo to the southeast, and Maravatío to the east. To the north it borders the municipality of Acámbaro in Guanajuato.

The flat western part of the municipality lies in the Lake Cuitzeo basin. Along the basin's eastern edge are a series of hills and ridges where the municipal seat is located. The Ucareo Valley in the eastern part of the municipality comprises part of an ancient caldera, and is over  higher in elevation than Lake Cuitzeo. It is an agricultural area flanked by forested hills and ridges.

Zinapécuaro's climate is temperate with summer rains. Average annual precipitation in the municipality ranges between 700 and 1600 millimetres.

History
Two Purépecha words have been suggested as possible sources of the place name Zinapécuaro: tzinapo "obsidian" or tzinápecua "healing". The obsidian quarries near Ucareo include one of the largest known pre-Hispanic quarries in Mesoamerica and were already exploited in the early Formative period. In the late Classic period Ucareo was the principal source of obsidian at Tula and Xochicalco, and Ucareo obsidian was distributed throughout central Mexico, Oaxaca and the northern Yucatán, being found as far away as Chichen Itza. In the Postclassic period the area was controlled by the Tarascans, who built a temple there to worship , the mother goddess of Purépecha mythology.

Around 1530, a Spanish settlement was founded at Zinapécuaro by the conquistador Don Luis Montañez. Zinapécuaro was first incorporated on 15 March 1825 as a partido in the department of Oriente in Michoacán. It became a free municipality on 5 February 1918.

Administration
The municipal government comprises a president, a councillor (Spanish: síndico), and ten trustees (regidores), six elected by relative majority and four by proportional representation. The current president of the municipality is Alejandro Correa.

Demographics
In the 2010 Mexican Census, the municipality of Zinapécuaro recorded a population of 46,666 inhabitants living in 11,608 households. It recorded a population of 47,327 inhabitants in the 2015 Intercensal Survey. 

There are 97 localities in the municipality, four of which are classified as urban:
Zinapécuaro de Figueroa, the seat of the municipality located in its west-central part, which recorded a population of 15,875 inhabitants in the 2010 Census;

Economy
Zinapécuaro's economy is largely dependent on foreign remittances. Fruit is produced in the area around Jeráhuaro and Ucareo in the eastern part of the municipality.

See also
 Las Tinajas, Zinapécuaro, a village in the municipality

References

Municipalities of Michoacán
1825 establishments in Mexico
States and territories established in 1825